The Liber Paradisus (Heaven Book) is a law text promulgated in 1256 by the Commune of Bologna which proclaimed the abolition of slavery and the release of serfs (servi della gleba).

History
thumb|300px|Plaque for the 750° anniversary with a citation of the "Liber Paradisus" at Palazzo d'Accursio, Bologna.
After the battle of Fossalta (1249) almost all Signorie (Lordships) of Bologna countryside were defeated. The result was an ethical and economic reflection on the serfs' status, until then determined by their bond to their owners, called Signori (Lords).

On 25 August 1256, the Arengo bell of the Palace of Podestà (Bologna) called Bolognese citizens into the Piazza Maggiore, where the Podestà (head of city government, expression of urban aristocracy), Bonaccorso da Soresina, and the Capitano del popolo (head of city militia, expression of urban bourgeoisie) announced the liberation of about 6,000 serfs, owned by 400 lords. They were emancipated by the payment, from the communal treasury, of 8 (for children) or 10 (for adults) Bolognese silver lire, which was the market price. For the emancipation of 5,855 serfs, the Commune paid 54,014 Bolognese Lire.

There was, arguably, some economic benefit for the city in the emancipation of so many serfs: firstly, free men were better workers; secondly, freedmen were no longer exempt from the taxes of the Commune (and, in fact, the Commune forbade freed serfs to move outside the diocese to which they belonged). In some cases, the serfs were gathered in certain free places (Italian: franco), from which the names of towns like Castelfranco Emilia.  Whether, however, the economic benefits outweighed the economic disadvantages caused by the loss of so much unremunerated labor is hard to assess.  Whatever the case, a combination of theological and practical concerns seems to have led to the extraordinary Bolognese mass manumission, and the Liber Paradisus is a powerful theological treatise on human equality.

"Heaven Book"
With this act, also called Paradisum voluptatis, Bologna was probably the first city in the world to abolish slavery.

In 1257 the Commune ordered four notaries – between them Rolandino de' Passaggeri – to catalogue names and details of freed serfs in a memorial. This book is now kept at the State Archives (in Piazza dei Celestini, Bologna), and it is called Paradisus because the first written word is Heaven, to remember that God created man in paradise in perfect and perpetual freedom.

Latin incipit: «Paradisum voluptatis plantavit dominus Deus omnipotens a principio, in quo posuit hominem, quem formaverat, et ipsius corpus ornavit veste candenti, sibi donans perfectissimam et perpetuam libertatem»

(«In the beginning God planted a paradise of delights, where he put the man whom he had formed, and adorned his body of a bright dress, giving him the most perfect and perpetual freedom»)

Editions

External links
 Online reading of Liber Paradisus

13th-century books
1250s in law
Serfdom
History of Bologna
1256 in Europe
13th century in Italy